Toby Couchman (born 16 September 2003) is an Australian professional rugby league footballer who plays as a  or  for the St. George Illawarra Dragons in the NRL.

Background 
Couchman was born in Wollongong, New South Wales. He was educated at Bulli High School. He played junior rugby league for Thirroul Butchers.

Playing career

Club career
Couchman was contracted to the St. George Illawarra Dragons as a junior coming through the ranks through the academy system alongside his twin brother Ryan Couchman.

In round 2 of the 2023 NRL season, Couchman made his first grade debut for the St. George Illawarra Dragons in place of the injured Jack de Belin in his side's 32−18 victory over the Gold Coast Titans at Jubilee Oval.

References

External links 
Dragons profile

2003 births
Living people
Australian rugby league players
St. George Illawarra Dragons players
Rugby league locks
Rugby league props